Scott Eugene Fischer (December 24, 1955 – May 11, 1996) was an American mountaineer and mountain guide. He was renowned for his ascents of the world's highest mountains made without the use of supplemental oxygen. Fischer and Wally Berg were the first Americans to summit Lhotse (27,940 feet / 8516 m), the world's fourth highest peak.  Fischer, Charley Mace, and Ed Viesturs summitted K2 (28,251 feet/ 8611m) without supplemental oxygen. Fischer first climbed Mount Everest (29,032 feet / 8,848.86 m) in 1994 and later died during the 1996 blizzard on Everest while descending from the peak.

Early life
Fischer was the son of Shirley and Gene Fischer, and was of German, Dutch, and Hungarian ancestry. He spent his early life in Michigan and New Jersey. After watching a TV documentary in 1970 in his home in the Basking Ridge section of Bernards Township, New Jersey about the National Outdoor Leadership School (NOLS) with his father, he headed to the Wind River Mountains of Wyoming for the summer. While attending Ridge High School, from which he graduated in 1973, he spent his summers in the mountains with NOLS, eventually becoming a full-time senior NOLS instructor.

Career
In 1977, Fischer attended an ice climbing seminar by Jeff Lowe in Utah. A group of climbers scaled the frozen Bridal Veil Falls in Provo Canyon. During the climb Fischer began to climb solo on the near vertical ice formation when his ice axe broke leaving him stranded. The others managed to get him a new axe but when he began ascending again the tool now popped out and he fell hundreds of feet. He survived, but injured his foot with his ice axe as he fell.

In 1984, Fischer and Wes Krause became the second ever team to scale the Breach Icicle on Mount Kilimanjaro in Africa after Reinhold Messner and Konrad Renzler in 1978.

In 1984, Fischer and two friends, Wes Krause and Michael Allison, founded Mountain Madness, an adventure travel service. He guided clients for climbing major mountain peaks around the world. In 1992, during the climb on K2 as a part of a Russian-American expedition, Fischer fell into a crevasse and tore the rotator cuff of his right shoulder. Against the advice of the doctor, Fischer spent two weeks trying to recover and asked climbing partner Ed Viesturs to tape his shoulder and tether it to his waist so it would not continue to dislocate and then resumed the climb using only his left arm. On their first summit bid, the climbers abandoned their attempt at Camp III to rescue Aleskei Nikiforov, Thor Keiser and Chantal Mauduit. Fischer and Ed Viesturs reached the summit on their second attempt without supplemental oxygen along with Charley Mace. During descent, they met climbers Rob Hall and Gary Ball who were suffering with altitude sickness at camp II. Hall's health improved along the descent but Ball required subsequent help from Fischer and the other climbers to reach the base.

Through Mountain Madness, Fischer guided the 1993 Climb for the Cure on Denali (20,320 feet) in Alaska which was organized by eight students at Princeton University. The expedition raised $280,000 for the American Foundation for AIDS Research. In 1994, Fischer and Rob Hess climbed Mount Everest without supplemental oxygen. They also formed a part of the expedition that removed 5000 pounds of trash and 150 discarded oxygen bottles from Everest. With the climb, Fischer had climbed the top of the highest peaks on six of the seven continents with the exception of Vinson Massif in Antarctica. The American Alpine Club awarded the David Brower Conservation Award to all members of the expedition. In January 1996, Fischer and Mountain Madness guided a fundraising ascent of Mount Kilimanjaro (19,341 feet / 5,895 m) in Africa.

Death

In May 1996, Fischer guided a team of 18 in climbing Everest which included two guides – Neal Beidleman and Anatoli Boukreev – and eight clients, assisted by eight Sherpas led by Lopsang Jangbu Sherpa. On May 6, the Mountain Madness team left base camp (5,364 meters) for their summit climb. At Camp II (6,400 meters), Fischer learned that his friend Dale Kruse was ill and was unable to make it out of Camp I (6,000 m). Fischer descended from Camp II, met up with Kruse and continued to base camp along with him. Leaving Kruse at the base camp, he ascended to rejoin his team at Camp II. He was slow on ascent to Camp III (7,200m) the following day and on May 9, he left Camp III for Camp IV at the South Col (7,950m). On May 10, Fischer reached the summit after 3:45 PM, much later than the safe turnaround time of 2:00 PM due to the unusually high number of climbers who tried to make it to the summit on the same day. He was exhausted from the ascent and becoming increasingly ill, possibly suffering from HAPE, HACE, or a combination of both.

His climbing partner, Lopsang Jangbu Sherpa, descended part of the way with him when a blizzard started. Near the Southeast ridge balcony (8,400m), Fischer asked Lopsang to descend without him and send back Boukreev for help. After the storm subsided, on May 11, two Sherpas reached Fischer and "Makalu" Gau Ming-Ho, leader of a Taiwanese expedition. Fischer was unresponsive and the Sherpas placed an oxygen mask over his face before carrying Gau to Camp IV. After rescuing other people, Boukreev finally reached Fischer, who was already dead. He described Fischer as having exhibited paradoxical undressing, commonly associated with hypothermia.  "His oxygen mask is around face, but bottle is empty. He is not wearing mittens; hands completely bare. Down suit is unzipped, pulled off his shoulder, one arm is outside clothing. There is nothing I can do. Scott is dead."  Boukreev shrouded Fischer's upper torso and moved his body off the main climbing route. His body remains on the mountain.

Lopsang Jangbu Sherpa died in an avalanche in autumn 1996 also on an expedition to Everest, and Boukreev died in December 1997 in an avalanche on an expedition to Annapurna. Fischer's climbing firm Mountain Madness was bought in 1997 by Keith and Christine Boskoff.

Personal life
In 1981, Fischer married Jeannie Price, who was his student on a NOLS Mountaineering Course in 1974. They moved to Seattle in 1982 where they had two children, Andy and Katie Rose Fischer-Price.

Legacy

A memorial stupa for Fischer was built by the Sherpas in 1996 outside the village of Dughla in the Solukhumbu District of Nepal. In 1997, Ingrid Hunt, the doctor who had accompanied the 1996 Mountain Madness Everest Expedition to Base Camp, returned to place a bronze memorial plaque on it in his honor.
The American Alpine Club established the Scott Fischer Memorial Conservation Fund in his memory which helps environmentally proactive expeditions throughout the world.
A route up Mount Kilimanjaro is dedicated to Fischer. This route is called the Western-Breach Route. There is a plaque in memorial for Fischer along this route.

In popular culture
In the 1997 TV movie Into Thin Air: Death on Everest, Fischer is portrayed by Peter Horton.
In the 2015 film Everest, Fischer is portrayed by Jake Gyllenhaal.

See also
List of Mount Everest summiters by number of times to the summit
List of people who died climbing Mount Everest

References

External sources

1955 births
1996 deaths
Ridge High School alumni
American people of Dutch descent
American people of German descent
American people of Hungarian descent
American mountain climbers
American summiters of Mount Everest
Mountaineering deaths on Mount Everest
People from Bernards Township, New Jersey
Mountain climbers from Seattle
Sportspeople from Somerset County, New Jersey